The Spanish Baja is a Rally raid event held in the region of Aragon in northern Spain.

This event was launched in 1983, based on the popularity of the African Adventure rallies, such as the Paris Dakar and the Pharaons Rally. The event's creators, a group of French and Spanish enthusiasts, chose the desert of Monegros because of the scenery and availability of service infrastructure in Zaragoza. The first Baja in Spain was called the Baja Montesblancos.

In 1992, the Spanish Baja was cancelled, as it coincided with the Olympic Games in Barcelona. After this, the Spanish Automobile Federation took over the organisation, and entered it into the FIA Cross Country Rally World Cup.

References

External links
Official website

Recurring sporting events established in 1983
Rally raid races
Auto races in Spain
Sport in Aragon
Cross Country Rally World Cup races